13th CFCA Awards
February 26, 2001

Best Film: 
 Almost Famous 
The 13th Chicago Film Critics Association Awards, given on 26 February 2001, honored the finest achievements in 2000 filmmaking.

Winners

Best Actor:
Tom Hanks - Cast Away
Best Actress:
Ellen Burstyn - Requiem for a Dream
Best Cinematography:
Wo hu cang long (Crouching Tiger, Hidden Dragon) - Peter Pau
Best Director:
Steven Soderbergh - Traffic
Best Film:
Almost Famous
Best Foreign Language Film:
Wo hu cang long (Crouching Tiger, Hidden Dragon), Taiwan/Hong Kong/United States/China
Best Score:
"Wo hu cang long (Crouching Tiger, Hidden Dragon)" - Tan Dun
Best Screenplay:
Almost Famous - Cameron Crowe
Best Supporting Actor:
Benicio del Toro - Traffic
Best Supporting Actress:
Frances McDormand - Almost Famous
Most Promising Actor:
Patrick Fugit
Most Promising Actress:
Zhang Ziyi

Nominees
Best Actor:
Javier Bardem - Before Night Falls
Michael Douglas - Wonder Boys
Mark Ruffalo - You Can Count on Me
Geoffrey Rush - Quills
Best Actress:
Joan Allen - The Contender
Björk Guðmundsdóttir - Dancer in the Dark
Laura Linney - You Can Count on Me
Julia Roberts - Erin Brockovich
Best Director:
Darren Aronofsky - Requiem for a Dream
Cameron Crowe - Almost Famous
Ang Lee - Wo hu cang long (Crouching Tiger, Hidden Dragon)
Robert Zemeckis - Cast Away
Best Film:
Wo hu cang long (Crouching Tiger, Hidden Dragon)
Traffic
Wonder Boys
You Can Count on Me
Best Supporting Actor:
Jack Black - High Fidelity
Willem Dafoe - Shadow of the Vampire
Albert Finney - Erin Brockovich
Philip Seymour Hoffman - Almost Famous
Best Supporting Actress:
Kate Hudson - Almost Famous
Julie Walters - Billy Elliot
Catherine Zeta-Jones - Traffic
Ziyi Zhang - Wo hu cang long (Crouching Tiger, Hidden Dragon)

References
https://web.archive.org/web/20120515203059/http://www.chicagofilmcritics.org/index.php?option=com_content&view=article&id=48&Itemid=58

 2000
2000 film awards